The 1960–61 Botola is the 5th season of the Moroccan Premier League. FAR Rabat are the holders of the title.

References

Morocco 1960–61

Botola seasons
Morocco
Botola